Isabelle Arnould (born 6 December 1970) is a retired female freestyle and butterfly swimmer from Belgium.

Arnould was born in Liège, and represented her native country at two consecutive Summer Olympics, starting in Seoul, South Korea (1988). She is best known for winning two medals at the 1993 Summer Universiade in Buffalo, United States.

References
 

1970 births
Living people
Belgian female freestyle swimmers
Belgian female butterfly swimmers
Olympic swimmers of Belgium
Swimmers at the 1988 Summer Olympics
Swimmers at the 1992 Summer Olympics
Sportspeople from Liège
Walloon sportspeople
South Carolina Gamecocks women's swimmers
Universiade medalists in swimming
Universiade silver medalists for Belgium
Universiade bronze medalists for Belgium
Medalists at the 1993 Summer Universiade
20th-century Belgian women